Désirée Ehrler (born 20 August 1991) is a Swiss racing cyclist, who most recently rode for UCI Women's Continental Team . She rode at the 2014 UCI Road World Championships.

Major results

2010
 2nd Halle-Buizingen
2012
 National Road Championships
4th Road race
4th Time trial
2014
 3rd Erondegemse Pijl
2015
 8th SwissEver GP Cham-Hagendorn
 10th Erondegemse Pijl
2017
 10th SwissEver GP Cham-Hagendorn
2018
 3rd SwissEver GP Cham-Hagendorn
 10th Omloop van de IJsseldelta
2020
 8th Gravel and Tar la Femme

References

External links
 

1991 births
Living people
Swiss female cyclists
Place of birth missing (living people)
21st-century Swiss women